England has a dense and modern transportation infrastructure. The Department for Transport is the government department responsible for the English transport network. Transport in England is facilitated with road, air, rail, and water networks.

The National Rail network of 10,072 route miles (16,116 km) in Great Britain and 189 route miles (303 route km) carries over 18,000 passenger and 1,000 freight trains daily. Urban rail networks exist Birmingham,  Liverpool, London, Manchester and Newcastle. There are many regional and international airports, with Heathrow Airport in London being one of the busiest in the world. The UK also has a network of ports which received over 558 million tons of goods in 2003–2004. Transport is the largest source of greenhouse gas emissions by the United Kingdom. 

The Secretary of State for Transport is the member of the cabinet responsible for the Department for Transport. The office used to be called the Minister of Transport and has been merged with the Secretary of State for the Environment at various times.

Transport trends 
Passenger transport has grown in recent years. Figures from the DfT show that total passenger travel inside the United Kingdom has risen from 403 billion passenger kilometres in 1970 to 793 billion in 2015.

Freight transport has undergone similar changes, increasing in volume and shifting from railways onto the road. In 1953 89 billion tonne kilometres of goods were moved, with rail accounting for 42%, road 36% and water 22%. By 2010 the volume of freight moved had more than doubled to 222 billion tonne kilometres, of which 9% was moved by rail, 19% by water, 5% by pipeline and 68% by road. Despite the growth in tonne kilometres, the environmental external costs of trucks and lorries in the UK have reportedly decreased. Between 1990 and 2000, there has been a move to heavier goods vehicles due to major changes in the haulage industry including a shift in sales to larger articulated vehicles. A larger than average fleet turnover has ensured a swift introduction of new and cleaner vehicles in England and the rest of the UK.

Figures from the DfT show in 2018 people made 4.8 billion local bus passenger journeys in England, 58% of all public transport journeys. There were 1.8 billion rail passenger journeys in England. Light rail and tram travel also continued to grow, to the highest level (0.3 million journeys) since comparable records began in 1983. Rail travel tends to be used for longer journeys. On average, people made 48 trips by bus and travelled 441 kilometres compared to 22 trips and 992 kilometres by rail in 2018. In 2018/19, there was £18.1bn of public expenditure on railways, an increase of 12% (£1.9bn). 

272 million passenger journeys were made on the eight light rail and tram systems in England in 2018/19. 87% of adults in London walked at least once a week - the highest rate in the country. This was followed by Isles of Scilly (83%) and Richmond upon Thames (83%). 57% of adults in Cambridge cycled at least once a week. This was followed by Oxford (39%) and Isles of Scilly (35%).

Rail 

English railway transport is largely based on services originating from one of London's rail termini operating in all directions on tracks mostly owned by Network Rail. The rail network in Great Britain is the oldest such network in the world. The system consists of five high-speed main lines (the West Coast, East Coast, Midland, Great Western and Great Eastern), which radiate from London to the rest of the country, augmented by regional rail lines and dense commuter networks within the major cities. High Speed 1 is operationally separate from the rest of the network, and is built to the same standard as the TGV system in France. 

The world's first passenger railway running on steam was the Stockton and Darlington Railway, opened on 27 September 1825. Just under five years later the world's first intercity railway was the Liverpool and Manchester Railway, designed by George Stephenson and opened by the Prime Minister, the Duke of Wellington on 15 September 1830. The network grew rapidly as a patchwork of literally hundreds of separate companies during the Victorian era, which eventually was consolidated into just four by 1922, as the boom in railways ended and they began to lose money. Eventually, the entire system came under state control in 1948, under the British Transport Commission's Railway Executive. After 1962 it came under the control of the British Railways Board; then British Railways (later British Rail). 

Opened in 1863, London Underground is the world's first underground railway. Henry Maudsley's most influential invention was the screw-cutting lathe, a machine which created uniformity in screws and allowed for the application of interchangeable parts (a prerequisite for mass production): it was a revolutionary development necessary for the Industrial Revolution. Brunel created the Great Western Railway, as well as famous steamships including the SS Great Britain, the first propeller-driven ocean-going iron ship, and SS Great Eastern which laid the first lasting transatlantic telegraph cable. 

In England, the infrastructure (track, stations, depots and signalling chiefly) is owned and maintained by Network Rail, a not-for-profit company. Passenger services are operated by train-operating companies (TOCs), which are franchises awarded by the Department for Transport (in England). Examples include Avanti West Coast and East Midlands Railway. Freight trains are operated by freight operating companies, such as DB Cargo UK, which are commercial operations unsupported by the government. Most train operating companies do not own the locomotives and coaches that they use to operate passenger services. Instead, they are required to lease these from the three rolling stock companies (ROSCOs), with train maintenance carried out by companies such as Bombardier and Alstom.

On High Speed 1, trains are now able to reach the speeds of French TGVs. High Speed 2 is a state-of-the-art, high-speed line critical for the UK's low carbon transport future. HS2 is a new high speed railway linking up London, the Midlands, the North and Scotland serving over 25 stations, including eight of Britain's 10 largest cities and connecting around 30 million. 

Network Rail are considering reopening a railway in south-west England connecting Tavistock to Okehampton and Exeter as an alternative to the coastal mainline which was damaged at Dawlish by coastal storms in February 2014, causing widespread disruption. To cope with increasing passenger numbers, there is a large ongoing programme of upgrades to the network, including Thameslink, Crossrail, electrification of lines, in-cab signalling, new inter-city trains and a new high-speed lines. The Office of Rail & Road (ORR) is the regulator for Network Rail, they are currently overseeing funding for Control Period 6 (CP6) – from 1 April 2019 to 31 March 2024. 

Short-distance travel that doesn't pass through London is generally referred to as cross country travel. Most services are operated by CrossCountry and often terminate in South East Wales or Scotland. The Oxford to Cambridge or Varsity Line is due to be rebuilt to enable journeys avoiding London and Birmingham. Regional train services are also operated by these, and other, train companies, and focus on the major cities, several of which have developed commuter and urban rail networks. This includes the London Overground in London and the Merseyrail, which operates in and around Liverpool. The London Underground (commonly known as the Tube) is the oldest and longest rapid transit system in the world.

Great British Railways is a planned state-owned public body that will oversee rail transport in Great Britain from 2023. The Office of Rail and Road is responsible for the economic and safety regulation of England's railways.

High-speed rail 

During the age of steam locomotion, the railway industry in England strove to develop reliable technology for powering high-speed rail services between major cities. Trains currently travel at 125 mph (200 km/h) on the East Coast Main Line, Great Western Main Line, Midland Main Line, parts of the Cross Country Route, and the West Coast Main Line.

High Speed 1 (HS1) line connects London to the Channel Tunnel, with international Eurostar services running from St Pancras International to cities in France, Belgium, and the Netherlands at 186 mph (300 km/h). HS1 line was finished on time and under budget.  The line is also used by high-speed commuter services from Kent to the capital.  The CTRL project saw new bridges and tunnels built, with a combined length nearly as long as the Channel Tunnel itself, and significant archaeological research undertaken. 

Government-backed plans to provide east-west high-speed services between cities in the North of England are also in development, as part of the Northern Powerhouse Rail project. In June 2014, the Chancellor of the Exchequer proposed a high speed rail link High Speed 3 (HS3) between Liverpool and Newcastle, Sheffield and Hull.  The line would utilise the existing route between Liverpool and Newcastle and Hull, and a new route from to Sheffield will follow the same route to Manchester Victoria, and then a new line from Victoria to Sheffield, with additional tunnels and other infrastructure. In July 2019 the Prime Minister announced a high-speed  Leeds to Manchester route.

Rapid transit 

Three cities in the United Kingdom have rapid transit systems. The most well known is the London Underground (commonly known as the Tube), the oldest rapid transit system in the world (opened 1863). Another system also in London is the separate Docklands Light Railway (opened 1987). Although this is more of an elevated light metro system due to its lower passenger capacities; further, it is integrated with the Underground in many ways). One other system, the Tyne & Wear Metro (opened 1980), serves Newcastle, Gateshead, Sunderland, North Tyneside and South Tyneside, and has many similarities to a rapid transit system including underground stations, but is sometimes considered to be light rail.

Trams and light rail 
Tram systems were popular in England in the late 19th and early 20th centuries. However, with the rise of the motor bus and later the car they began to be widely dismantled in the 1950s. By 1962, only Blackpool tramway remained. However, in recent years trams have seen a revival, as in other countries, as have light rail systems. Examples of this second generation of tram systems and light rail include:
Docklands Light Railway in East London
Manchester Metrolink in Greater Manchester
Nottingham Express Transit in Nottingham
Sheffield Supertram in Sheffield
Tramlink in Croydon
Tyne & Wear Metro in Tyne & Wear
West Midlands Metro in the West Midlands

Other transport

Road 

Road is the most popular method of transport in the United Kingdom, carrying over 90% of motorised passenger travel and 65% of domestic freight. The major motorways and trunk roads, many of which are dual carriageway, form the trunk network which links all cities and major towns. These carry about one third of the nation's traffic, and occupy about 0.16% of its land area.

National Highways (a government-owned company) is responsible for maintaining motorways and trunk roads in England. Other English roads are maintained by local authorities. In London, Transport for London is responsible for all trunk roads and other major roads, which are part of the Transport for London Road Network.

Driving is on the left. The usual maximum speed limit is 70 miles per hour (112 km/h) on motorways and dual carriageways. On 29 April 2015, the UK Supreme Court ruled that the government must take immediate action to cut air pollution, following a case brought by environmental lawyers at ClientEarth.

Motorways 

England contains a vast majority of the UK's motorways, dating from the first built in 1958 (part of the M6) to the most recent (M6 Toll). Important motorways include:

Air transport 
England is home to many of Europe's largest and busiest airports. London Heathrow, which handles over 80 million international passengers annually, is the largest airport in the UK. London serves as the largest aviation hub in the world by passenger traffic, with six international airports, handling over 180 million passengers in 2019, more than any other city. London's second-busiest airport, London Gatwick, was until 2016 the world's busiest single-runway airport. Manchester Airport is the United Kingdom's third-busiest airport. London Stansted and London Luton are the fourth and fifth busiest airports.

The largest airport operator is Heathrow Airport Holdings (owner of Heathrow), followed by Manchester Airports Group (owner of Manchester, Stansted and East Midlands). Together with British Airways and Virgin Atlantic, they are part of the Aviation Foundation.

Bus transport 

Buses play a major role in the public transport of England, as well as seeing extensive private use. While rail transport has increased over the past twenty years due to road congestion, the same does not apply to buses, which have generally been used less, apart from in London where their use has increased significantly. Bus transport is heavily subsidised, especially in London. In 2014/15, there were 4.65 billion bus journeys in England, 2.4 billion of which were in London.

Cycle infrastructure 

The National Cycle Network, created by the charity Sustrans, is the UK's major network of signed routes for cycling. It uses dedicated bike paths as well as roads with minimal traffic, and covers 14,000 miles, passing within a mile of half of all homes. Other cycling routes such as The National Byway, the Sea to Sea Cycle Route and local cycleways can be found across the country.

Segregated cycle paths are being installed in cities throughout England such as London, Manchester, and Bristol for example. In London Transport for London has installed Cycleways. The Department for Transport have made several key infrastructure investments, announcements and schemes to improve cycle infrastructure in England.

Water transport 
Major canal building began in England after the onset of the Industrial revolution in the 18th century. A large canal network was built and it became the primary method of transporting goods throughout the country; however, by the 1830s with the development of the railways, the canal network began to go into decline. There are currently  of waterways in the United Kingdom and the primary use is recreational.  is used for commerce.

Education and professional development 

England has a well-developed network of organisations offering education and professional development in the transport and logistics sectors. A number of universities offer degree programmes in transport, usually covering transport planning, engineering of transport infrastructure, and management of transport and logistics services. The Institute for Transport Studies at the University of Leeds is one such organisation. Public research universities like The Open University  offer degrees in transport, logistics, civil engineering and management studies.  

Pupils in England can study transport and logistics in apprenticeship studies at further education and sixth form colleges. Professional development for those working in the transport and logistics sectors is provided by a number of Professional Institutes representing specific sectors. These include: 

 Chartered Institute of Logistics and Transport (CILT(UK))
 Chartered Institution of Highways and Transportation (CIHT)
Chartered Institution of Railway Operators
 Transport Planning Society (TPS)

Through these professional bodies, transport planners and engineers can train for a number of professional qualifications, including:

 Chartered engineer
 Incorporated engineer
 Transport planning professional

See also
 Transport in London
 Transport in Northern Ireland
 Transport in Scotland
 Transport in Wales
 Climate Change Act 2008

References

 
Transport in the United Kingdom